The 21st Directors Guild of America Awards, honoring the outstanding directorial achievements in film and television in 1968, were presented in 1969.

Winners and nominees

Film

Television

External links
 

Directors Guild of America Awards
1968 film awards
1968 television awards
Direct
Direct
1968 awards in the United States